The following is a list of Singaporean electoral divisions from 1972 to 1976 that served as constituencies that elected Members of Parliament (MPs) to the 3rd Parliament of Singapore in the 1972 Singaporean general elections. The number of seats in Parliament had increased by 7 to 65 seats.

Constituencies

Alexandra
Aljunied
Anson
Boon Teck
Bras Basah
Bukit Batok
Bukit Ho Swee
Bukit Merah
Bukit Panjang
Bukit Timah
Cairnhill
Changi
Chua Chu Kang
Crawford
Delta
Farrer Park
Geylang East
Geylang Serai
Geylang West
Havelock
Henderson
Hong Lim
Jalan Besar
Jalan Kayu
Joo Chiat
Jurong
Kallang
Kampong Chai Chee
Kampong Glam
Kampong Kapor
Kampong Kembangan
Kampong Ubi
Katong
Kim Keat
Kim Seng
Kreta Ayer
Kuo Chuan
Leng Kee
MacPherson
Moulmein
Mountbatten
Nee Soon
Pasir Panjang
Paya Lebar
Potong Pasir
Punggol
Queenstown
River Valley
Rochore
Sembawang
Sepoy Lines
Serangoon Gardens
Siglap
Stamford
Tampines
Tanglin
Tanjong Pagar
Telok Ayer
Telok Blangah
Thomson
Tiong Bahru
Toa Payoh
Ulu Pandan
Upper Serangoon
Whampoa

References

External links 
 

1972